Tyagbir Hem Baruah College is an institution for higher education located in Jamugurihat in Naduar area under Sonitpur district of Assam, India. The college was established in 1963. The college is named after Tyagbir Hem Barua, a noted Indian independence activist, social worker and writer of Assam.

Geography
Tyagbir Hem Baruah College  is an institution for higher education. The college was established in 1963.

The college is located at Karchantola within the Naduar area and is about 4.5 km away from the heart of Jamugurihat towards east. The campus has a nice looking surrounding endowed with different kinds of valuable Plants, Wetlands, Ponds and a Small Tea Garden. The necessary civic amenities such as Bank, Hospital, Post-Office, Police Station etc. are available within a reachable distance. There are internal roads, street lights, canteen, gym, out-door stadium etc. in the college.
The college is well connected with roads and is situated alongside of the N.H.-52. in a distance of 55 km eastward from the District H.Q. Tezpur and 20 km westward from Biswanath Chariali.

Courses
The college offers the following courses:
Two-year higher secondary courses in arts and science under Assam Higher Secondary Education Council,  Three-year degree courses in arts and science stream under Gauhati University and U.G.C sponsored career oriented courses are conducted in this college.

Facilities

Computer Center

The Computer Education Center of THB College was started from September 2003.

Central Library
The Central Library of THB College was set up in 1963 with a collection of about 1,050 books and a few journals.

Departments

Science

Zoology
Mathematics
Chemistry
Botany
Physics
Statistics

Arts
Assamese
Nepali
Bodo
English
History
Education
Economics
Political Science
Geography

See also
 Hem Barua
 List of accredited colleges in Assam

References

External links
 

Educational institute in Jamugurihat
Universities and colleges in Assam
Educational institutions established in 1963
Sonitpur district
1963 establishments in Assam
Colleges affiliated to Gauhati University